A , literally "incarnation", was believed to be the manifestation of a buddha in the form of an indigenous kami, an entity who had come to guide the people to salvation, during the era of shinbutsu-shūgō in premodern Japan.

The gongen concept is the cornerstone of the honji suijaku theory, according to which Buddhist deities choose to appear to the Japanese as native kami in order to save them, which is based on the Mahayana Buddhist notion of upaya, "expedient means".

History 
It is sometimes assumed that the word gongen derives from Tokugawa Ieyasu's posthumous name (Tōshō Daigongen). However, the term was created and started being used in the middle of the Heian period in an effort to harmonize Buddhism and indigenous religious practice in what is called shinbutsu-shūgō or "syncretism of kami and buddhas". At that time, the assumption that Japanese kami and buddhas were essentially the same evolved into a theory called , which held that native kami were manifestations or avatars of buddhas, bodhisattvas and other Buddhist deities. The theory gradually spread around the country and the concept of gongen, a dual entity composed of a buddha and a kami, evolved.

Under the influence of Tendai Buddhism and Shugendō, the gongen concept was adapted to religious beliefs tied to Mount Iwaki, a volcano, so that female kami Kuniyasutamahime became associated with Avalokiteśvara ekadaśamukha (Jūichimen Kannon Bosatsu, "Eleven-Faced Guanyin"), Ōkuninushi with Bhaisajyaguru (Yakushi Nyōrai) and Kuninotokotachi with Amitābha (Amida Nyōrai).

The title "gongen" started being attached to the names of kami and shrines were built within the premises of large Buddhist temples to enshrine their tutelary kami. During the Japanese Middle Ages, shrines started being called with the name gongen to underline their ties to Buddhism. For example, in Eastern  Japan there are still many Mount Haku shrines where the shrine itself is called either gongen or jinja.

Gongen of Japan 
 , also called "Izuna Myōjin" and enshrined in Izuna Shrine in Nagano, is similar to a tengu and represents the kami of Mount Iizuna.
The kami enshrined in the three Kumano Sanzan Grand Shrines and worshipped in Kumano shrines are the three Kumano mountains: Hongū, Shingū, and Nachi.
  was enshrined in Jingo-ji in Takao as the tutelary kami of Shingon Buddhism by Kūkai.
  is one of the most famous examples of gongen, representing Tokugawa Ieyasu posthumously enshrined in so-called Tōshō-gū shrines present all over Japan. The original one is Nikkō Tōshō-gū in Nikkō, Tochigi.

Gongen-zukuri 

 is the name of a complex Shinto shrine structure in which the haiden, or worship hall, and the honden, or main sanctuary, are interconnected under the same roof in the shape of an H. One of the oldest examples of gongen-zukuri is Kitano Tenmangū in Kyoto. The name comes from Nikkō Tōshō-gū in Nikkō because it enshrines the Tōshō Daigongen and adopts this structure.

See also 
 The Glossary of Shinto for an explanation of terms concerning Japanese Shinto, Shinto art, and Shinto shrine architecture

Notes

References 

 

 
Buddhist deities
Buddhism in Japan
Shinto terminology
Shinbutsu shūgō
Shugendō